The Haunting of Hill House is an American supernatural horror drama streaming television miniseries created and directed by Mike Flanagan, produced by Amblin Television and Paramount Television, for Netflix, and serves as the first entry in The Haunting anthology series. It is loosely based on the 1959 novel of the same name by Shirley Jackson. The plot alternates between two timelines, following five adult siblings whose paranormal experiences at Hill House continue to haunt them in the present day, and flashbacks depicting events leading up to the eventful night in 1992 when the family fled from the mansion. The ensemble cast features Michiel Huisman, Elizabeth Reaser, Oliver Jackson-Cohen, Kate Siegel, and Victoria Pedretti as the siblings in adulthood, with Carla Gugino and Henry Thomas as parents Olivia and Hugh Crain, and Timothy Hutton appearing as an older version of Hugh.

The series premiered on Netflix on October 12, 2018. The Haunting of Hill House received critical acclaim, particularly for its acting, directing, and production values. A follow-up series by Flanagan titled The Haunting of Bly Manor, with most of the same crew and some of the same cast but a different story and characters, was released on October 9, 2020.

Synopsis

In the summer of 1992, Hugh and Olivia Crain and their five children—Steven, Shirley, Theodora (Theo), Luke, and Eleanor (Nell)—move into Hill House to renovate the mansion in order to sell it and build their own house, designed by Olivia. However, due to unexpected repairs, they have to stay longer, and they begin to experience increasing paranormal phenomena, resulting in a tragic loss and the family fleeing from the house. Twenty-six years later, the Crain siblings and their estranged father reunite after another tragedy strikes them, and they are forced to confront how their time in Hill House has affected each of them.

Cast and characters

Main

 Michiel Huisman and Paxton Singleton as Steven Crain, the eldest son of the family. He became a famous author after writing about his family's experiences at Hill House, despite his siblings' disapproval.
 Carla Gugino as Olivia Crain, the matriarch of the family, who designs houses. She, along with her youngest daughter Nell, is among the most affected by the paranormal activity in the house.
 Timothy Hutton and Henry Thomas as Hugh Crain, the patriarch of the family, who flips houses. He becomes estranged from his children after the events at Hill House.
 Elizabeth Reaser and Lulu Wilson as Shirley Crain Harris, the eldest daughter of the family. She owns a mortuary with her husband Kevin. They have a son and a daughter.
 Oliver Jackson-Cohen and Julian Hilliard as Luke Crain, older twin of Nell and one of the two youngest members of the family. He struggles with addiction as an adult to push out his memories of Hill House.
 Kate Siegel and Mckenna Grace as Theodora "Theo" Crain, the middle child of the five, and a child psychologist. "Sensitive" like her mother, she wears gloves to prevent touching other people and experiencing psychic knowledge about them.
 Victoria Pedretti and Violet McGraw as Eleanor "Nell" Crain Vance, Luke's younger twin and one of the two youngest members of the family. She has never fully recovered from the haunting she experienced while living in Hill House.

Recurring

 Annabeth Gish as Clara Dudley, she and her husband are the caretakers of the house and help the Crains in their efforts to revamp the mansion. 
 Robert Longstreet as Horace Dudley, married to Clara Dudley. They both live close to the mansion while the act as caretakers for the property. 
 Anthony Ruivivar as Kevin Harris, Shirley's husband. 
 Samantha Sloyan as Leigh Crain, Steven's wife. 
 Levy Tran as Trish Park, Theo's lover. 
 James Lafferty as Ryan Quale, an apparition from Shirley's memory. 
 James Flanagan as Funeral Director 
 Jordane Christie as Arthur Vance, Nell's sleep technologist and later husband. 
 Elizabeth Becka as Aunt Janet, sister of Olivia Crain. 
 Logan Medina as Jayden Harris, son of Shirley and Kevin. 
 May Badr as Allie Harris, daughter of Shirley and Kevin. 
 Anna Enger as Joey, a recovering addict that Luke tries to help. 
 Fedor Steer as William Hill, former owner of Hill House who went insane and bricked himself behind a wall; appears as Tall Man / Bowler Hat Man. 
 Olive Elise Abercrombie as Abigail Dudley, the daughter of Clara and Horace, and young Luke's friend from the woods. 
 Catherine Parker as Poppy Hill, one of the ghosts inhabiting Hill House, wife of William Hill and considered insane when alive. 
 Mimi Gould as Hazel Hill, one of the ghosts inhabiting Hill House

Episodes

Production

Development
On April 10, 2017, Netflix announced that it had ordered a 10-episode adaptation of the classic horror novel The Haunting of Hill House, with Mike Flanagan and Trevor Macy as executive producers, and Amblin Television  and Paramount Television as co-production companies. It is the first scripted series to be made for Netflix by Amblin.

Production on the series began in October 2017 in Atlanta, Georgia, with location filming in the city and its environs. Bisham Manor, former name of the property located in LaGrange, served as the exterior of "Hill House." The house's interior settings were filmed at EUE/Screen Gem Studios in Atlanta.

Music
The soundtrack was composed by The Newton Brothers. On October 31, 2018, Waxwork Records released the soundtrack on a double LP.

Track listing

Reception

Critical reception
On Rotten Tomatoes, The Haunting of Hill House has a 93% "certified fresh" rating based on 103 reviews, with an average rating of 8.4/10. The website's critical consensus reads, "The Haunting of Hill House is an effective ghost story whose steadily mounting anticipation is just as satisfying as its chilling payoff." On Metacritic, it has a weighted average score of 79 out of 100 based on 18 critics, indicating "generally favorable reviews."

Corrine Corrodus of The Telegraph graded the series with a 5/5 rating, calling it "the most complex and complete horror series of its time." Brian Tallerico of RogerEbert.com gave unanimous praise to the Netflix adaptation, describing it as "essential viewing," and stated that "[the show] contains some of the most unforgettable horror imagery in film or television in years." David Griffin of IGN gave the series a rating of 9.5 out of 10, calling it "a superb and terrifying family drama," and Paul Tassi of Forbes described it as "absolutely fantastic" and stated that "it may actually be Netflix's best original show ever."

Horror author Stephen King, who holds considerable admiration for Jackson's novel, tweeted about the series, "I don't usually care for this kind of revisionism, but this is great. Close to a work of genius, really. I think Shirley Jackson would approve, but who knows for sure."

In January 2020, filmmaker Quentin Tarantino said, "My favorite Netflix series, with no competition, is The Haunting of Hill House."

Awards and nominations

Home media
In August 2019, it was announced that The Haunting of Hill House would be released on Blu-ray and DVD from Paramount Home Entertainment on October 15, 2019. The release includes extended director's cuts of three episodes ("Steven Sees a Ghost", "The Bent-Neck Lady" and "Silence Lay Steadily"), all of which also have audio commentaries from Flanagan, and an additional audio commentary for "Two Storms".

Follow-up series

In October 2018, Flanagan said that a possible second season would not continue the story of the Crain family, specifying, "it's done." On February 21, 2019, Netflix renewed the series for a second season as an anthology series, titled The Haunting of Bly Manor, and based on The Turn of the Screw by Henry James. It was released on October 9, 2020. The second season features the return of several Hill House actors portraying new characters, including Victoria Pedretti, Oliver Jackson-Cohen, Henry Thomas, Kate Siegel, Katie Parker and Carla Gugino.

See also
 Other adaptations of The Haunting of Hill House

Notes

References

Further reading

 
 
 
 
 
 
 
 
 
 
 
 
 Wetmore, Kevin. The Streaming of Hill House: Essays on the Haunting Netflix Adaption.

External links

 
 
  The Haunting of Hill House at Amblin Television
  The Haunting of Hill House at Paramount Television

2010s American drama television miniseries
2010s American horror television series
2010s American LGBT-related drama television series
2010s American mystery television series
2010s American supernatural television series
2018 American television series debuts
2018 American television series endings
Adaptations of works by Shirley Jackson
Adultery in television
English-language Netflix original programming
Television series about ghosts
Horror drama television series
Lesbian-related television shows
Nonlinear narrative television series
Television shows about psychic powers
Television series by Amblin Entertainment
Television series by Paramount Television
Television series set in 1992
Television series set in 2018
Television shows based on American novels
Television shows filmed in Atlanta
Television shows set in Boston
LGBT speculative fiction television series
Works set in country houses